The 1988 Canadian National Challenge Cup was won by the Holy Cross Crusaders from St. John's, Newfoundland. Six members from this team have been elected to the Newfoundland Soccer Hall of Fame.

Rosters
Holy Cross
Bob Thompson
John Breen
Paul Mullett
Bruce Tobin
assistant coach Gerry 'Farmer' Reddy
Tony Mullett
Bill Breen
Barry Piercey
manager Doug Redmond
Gary Breen
Darryl Smith
Dick Power
Bob Breen
A.J. Breen
manager Bern Tobin
George Joyce
Gus Richards
Dean Mullett
Bernard 'Fox' Reddy
coach Brian Murphy
Bob O'Leary
 Shawn Browne

References

1988
Canadian National Challenge Cup
Nat